The United States District Court for the District of Kansas (in case citations, D. Kan.)  is the federal district court whose jurisdiction is the state of Kansas. The Court operates out of the Robert J. Dole United States Courthouse in Kansas City, Kansas, the Frank Carlson Federal Building in Topeka, and the United States Courthouse in Wichita. The District of Kansas was created in 1861, replacing the territorial court that preceded it, and President Abraham Lincoln appointed Archibald Williams as the Court's first judge. 

Appeals from the District of Kansas are made to the United States Court of Appeals for the Tenth Circuit (except for patent claims and claims against the U.S. government under the Tucker Act, which are appealed to the Federal Circuit).

 the United States Attorney is Kate E. Brubacher. On March 12, 2015, Ronald L. Miller, most recently police chief of Topeka, Kansas, was confirmed as U.S. Marshal.

The Clerk of Court is Skyler B. O'Hara, who is located in Topeka.

Current judges 

:

Vacancies and pending nominations

Former judges

Chief judges

Succession of seats

See also 
 Courts of Kansas
 List of current United States district judges
 List of United States federal courthouses in Kansas

References

External links 
 
 United States Attorney for the District of Kansas Official Website

Kansas
Kansas law
Wichita, Kansas
Kansas City, Kansas
Topeka, Kansas
1861 establishments in Kansas
Courthouses in Kansas
Courts and tribunals established in 1861